Whitney Seymour may refer to:

Whitney North Seymour (1901–1983), American attorney, solicitor general under President Herbert Hoover
Whitney North Seymour Jr. (1923–2019), American attorney and New York State Senator